"Money for Nothing" is the debut single released by Swedish singer Darin in 2005. The song is taken from his debut commercial album, The Anthem. The song was written and composed by Robyn, Johan Ekhé, Ulf Lindström and Remee and reached the top of the Swedish Singles Chart, was certified platinum and was awarded a Grammis for song of the year.

Music video
The video features Darin in a large room with various colourful patterns on the walls surrounding him depicting the earth and he is underneath the layers of mud and clay. He is also seen leaning against a stone wall in the video and standing with a girl singing to her in the street. The video was produced by Mikael Gemoll and Bobby. The video for Money For Nothing also appears on the DVD Tour Videos Interview which was released in 2006.

Track listing
 "Money for Nothing" – 4:06
 "Money for Nothing" (Instrumental) – 4:03

Charts

Weekly charts

Year-end charts

Certifications

References 

2005 debut singles
Darin (singer) songs
Songs written by Remee
Songs written by Johan Ekhé
Songs written by Ulf Lindström
2005 songs
Song recordings produced by Ghost (production team)
Number-one singles in Sweden
Songs written by Robyn
RCA Records singles